Hard Reset is a first-person shooter for Microsoft Windows, developed by Flying Wild Hog and released in September 2011. The game features a cyberpunk plot within a dystopian world, and draws inspiration from the works of William Gibson, Neal Stephenson, and Philip K. Dick to create its story, setting and atmosphere. In 2012, Hard Reset received a free expansion titled Hard Reset: Exile, and was then bundled as Hard Reset: Extended Edition. In 2016, a remastered version called Hard Reset Redux was released alongside versions for PlayStation 4 and Xbox One with upgraded graphics and new weapons and enemies. Redux was made available for Amazon Luna in October 2020.

Gameplay 
Hard Reset is modeled on video games such as Quake and Unreal, which results in more straightforward gameplay than most contemporary first-person shooters. The various stages have secret areas with hidden pick ups such as health and ammunition. The environments are designed similarly, as there are explosive barrels and various vending machines outfitted with electroshock anti-vandalism defenses, that can trigger splash damage by being shot at, scattered throughout the levels, which the player can use by luring enemies near them. The game lacks a multiplayer mode, which was a chief criticism.

Unlike most old-school first-person shooters, which feature a liberal variety of guns and throwable weapons that can be stored in a magic satchel-style inventory, Hard Reset features only two weapons, the CLN Modular Assault Rifle, and the EEF-21 Plasma Rifle. Both weapons have unlockable firing modes, the Modular Assault Rifle including the option to strap add-ons such as grenade and rocket launchers, and the plasma rifle allowing railguns and stasis modules.

Exile and Extended Edition 
Hard Reset: Exile is a free expansion for Hard Reset. It was first released in April 2012 as a part of the boxed Hard Reset re-release called Hard Reset: Extended Edition. The expansion is available for all Steam owners of Hard Reset for free since May 2012. Hard Reset: Exile features a few new weapons, levels, enemy types, and a boss. It further continues the story of James Fletcher, as he journeys into the outer city's robot-controlled territory and tracks down the Corporation's secret weapon that is self-aware and blocks the path toward the "Resistance" bases.

Reception 

Both Hard Reset and Hard Reset Redux received "mixed or average" reviews on all platforms according to the review aggregation website Metacritic. Reviewers cited the visual quality and the intensity of the gameplay as strong points, evoking comparisons to other "old-school" shooters as Serious Sam or Painkiller. Common points of contention were the game's relatively short length, limited level design, and the perceived difficulty.

References

External links 

2011 video games
Cyberpunk video games
Dystopian video games
First-person shooters
Video games developed in Poland
Windows games
PlayStation 4 games
Post-apocalyptic video games
Xbox One games
Single-player video games
Video games scored by Marcin Przybyłowicz
Flying Wild Hog games